T. Mabry Carlton, Jr. Memorial Reserve, also known as the Carlton Reserve, is a  preserve in Sarasota County, Florida. The reserve has  of hiking, equestrian and biking trails.

History
In the 1920s, the Ringling brothers invested in large tracts of land within the eastern portion of Sarasota County. It was then bought by the MacArthur Foundation and subsequently known as the Ringling–MacArthur Tract or Ringling–MacArthur Reserve. A referendum approved by county voters on November 2, 1982, permitted the county to issue up to $30 million in general obligation bonds ($ in  dollars) to purchase the land for a water wellfield along with conservation and recreational uses. The county initially purchased  of the land from MacArthur Foundation for $18.5 million in 1984. An additional  was purchased in 1987 for $4.9 million. Southwest Florida Water Management District (SWFWMD) purchased  through the state's "Save Our Rivers" program in 1994. A land swap between the water district and Sarasota County was done as part of the purchase and added  to the preserve.

The site is named in honor of Thomas Mabry Carlton Jr., a county commissioner who had a critical role in acquiring the land. He died in a plane crash at his family ranch in 1989.

Environment
Habitats in the preserve include dry prairie, pine flatwoods, mesic hammocks and seasonal wetlands. Wildlife on the land include white-tailed deer, wild turkey, bobcats, swallow-tailed kites, eastern diamondback rattlesnakes, and wading birds. The wildflowers pine lily, tarflower and Iris versicolor, the purple iris, have been identified on the property.

The park's  Myakka Island Wilderness Trail connects the Carlton Reserve with Myakka River State Park, located north of the preserve. Approximately  of the Myakka River abuts the reserve.

The preserve also connects east to the Big Slough Preserve and Myakkahatchee Creek Environmental Park through the South Powerline Trail.

References

External links
Official website

Nature reserves in Florida
Protected areas of Sarasota County, Florida
Parks in Sarasota County, Florida
Protected areas established in 1984
1984 establishments in Florida